Baemikkumi Sculpture Park is a sculpture park rest at the southern part of the Modo Island, which is one of the nearest islets to Yeongjongdo Island in South Korea. The park contains around hundred modern and abstract surrealistic sculptures are displayed on the theme of eroticism. The park's collection of large-scale works by sculptor Lee Il-Ho, many of which sit conspicuously along the beach.

Incheon International Airport is the nearest site of the park.

History
Baemikkumi Sculpture Park is a landmark park. The name 'baemikkumi' comes from the local dialect, as people say the island resembles the shape of a hole normally seen from the bottom of a ship as 'baemit' translates to the bilge, and 'kkumi' is most closely translated to mean 'a hole' in English.

Lee Il-Ho, a Korean surrealist sculptor in primarily decided to make a personal studio for display own artworks in the Modo Island in harmony with the nature and the ocean. It was just an art studio of him before, but after increasing numinous artworks became the present sculpture park.

In popular culture
Baemikkumi sculpture park became popular after its appearance in the Korean romantic drama film Time directed by Kim Ki-duk.

References

External links
 Baemikkumi Sculpture Park in Korea Tourism Organization

Parks in Incheon
Erotic art